Boneh-ye Chahar (also Romanized as Boneh-ye Chahār; also known as Boneh-ye Chāreh) is a village in Garmsar Rural District, Jebalbarez-e Jonubi District, Anbarabad County, Kerman Province, Iran. At the 2006 census, its population was 91, in 21 families.

References 

Populated places in Anbarabad County